Cymbium cucumis, commonly known as the cucumber volute, is a species of sea snail, a marine gastropod mollusk in the family Volutidae, the volutes.

Distribution
This species occurs in the Atlantic Ocean of Morocco.

References

 Lowe R.T. (1861). A list of shells observed or collected at Mogador and in its immediate environs, during a few days' visit to the place, in April 1859. Proceedings of the Zoological Society of London 1860: 169-204
 Pallary P. (1930). Révision du genre Yetus. Annales du Musée d'Histoire Naturelle de Marseille 22(3): 54-77, pl. 1-2
 Gofas, S.; Le Renard, J.; Bouchet, P. (2001). Mollusca. in: Costello, M.J. et al. (eds), European Register of Marine Species: a check-list of the marine species in Europe and a bibliography of guides to their identification. Patrimoines Naturels. 50: 180-213.
 Bail, P.; Poppe, G.T. (2001). A conchological iconography: a taxonomic introduction of the recent Volutidae. ConchBooks, Hackenheim. 30 pp, 5 pl.

External links
 Röding P.F. (1798). Museum Boltenianum sive Catalogus cimeliorum e tribus regnis naturæ quæ olim collegerat Joa. Fried Bolten, M. D. p. d. per XL. annos proto physicus Hamburgensis. Pars secunda continens Conchylia sive Testacea univalvia, bivalvia & multivalvia. Trapp, Hamburg. viii, 199 pp
 MNHN, Paris: syntype

Volutidae
Gastropods described in 1798